Mary Lyndon Shanley (born 1944) is a feminist legal scholar specializing in issues of the American family and reproductive technologies. Her book Just Marriage weighed into the controversy around gay marriage with a historical and political science perspective. She has written on the idea of the "ethic of care" in US political science.

Education 
Shanley received her B.A. from Wellesley College and her Masters and Doctoral degrees in political science from Harvard University.

Career 
She is the Margaret Stiles Halleck Professor of Political Science at Vassar College and lives in Poughkeepsie, NY where she also teaches a writing course to women in the local jail.

Books

References 

1944 births
American feminists
American jurists
Living people
Wellesley College alumni
Harvard University alumni
Vassar College faculty